Andinoacara blombergi, is a species of fish in the family Cichlidae in the order Perciformes, found on the South American Pacific slope, in the río Esmeraldas drainage in northwestern Ecuador.

Etymology
The fish is named for Rolf Blomberg (1912-1996) because of his expeditions in Ecuador.

Description

Males can reach a length of  total in length.

Spawning
The fish is an egglayer.

References

blombergi
, 
Taxa named by Sven O. Kullander
Fish described in 2012
Freshwater fish of Ecuador